Agathiyan (born 18 August 1952) is an Indian film director, screenwriter, producer, lyricist, and actor. He was the first director in Tamil cinema to win the National Film Award for Best Direction for Kadhal Kottai (1996). For the film, he also won National Film Award for Best Screenplay and Filmfare Award for Best Director – Tamil.

Career
Agathiyan, a director in his late forties entered films a decade back and struggled as an assistant to various directors. Hailing from a agriculturist family, he spent a happy-go-lucky time in college, and when he decided to pack his bags and come to Chennai to try his luck in films as a director, he lost his family's support. Struggling with no money, he did odd jobs in film companies and became an assistant to anyone who offered him food and shelter.

He initially directed movie in 1991 and was credited as Ravi Thasan but it was unsuccessful. Anbalaya Prabhakaran, who acted in that movie and also produces small budgeted films with new directors, gave Ahahtian his second break as a director with Madhumathi, a teenage love story with new faces. The film was a big hit. He was back to where he started, but again fate had bigger things in store for him. Sivasakthi Pandian, a film distributor turned producer, produced Vaanmathi with Ajith and Swathi. The film was a hit. Next came Kadhal Kottai from the same banner and Ahahtian became the toast of the industry. Offers poured in for films.

In late 2014, he began work on an untitled project produced by Bharathiraja starring Santhosh Prathap, Oviya, Vijayalakshmi and Manoj Bharathiraja, but the film was later shelved. He have served as jury member at 57th National Film Awards.

Personal life
He married Radha in 1978. His elder daughter Kani (Karthika), host of Makkal TV, is married to film director Thiru. Kani Thiru is a winner of Vijay TV's Cook With Comali (Season 2). His second daughter Vijayalakshmi Agathiyan is an actress and is married to film director Feroz. His younger daughter Niranjani Ahathian is a costume designer and actress who is married to director Desingh Periyasamy.

Filmography
Films

Television

Discography
As lyricist

Awards
National Film Awards
 1997 – Best Direction – Kadhal Kottai
 1997 – Best Screenplay – Kadhal Kottai
 1997 – National Film Award for Best Feature Film in Tamil – Kadhal Kottai

Filmfare Awards South
 1997 – Best Director – Kadhal Kottai

Tamil Nadu State Film Awards
 1996 – Best Director – Kadhal Kottai

References

External links
 

Living people
Tamil film directors
Tamil Nadu State Film Awards winners
Filmfare Awards South winners
Best Director National Film Award winners
20th-century Indian film directors
21st-century Indian film directors
Hindi-language film directors
Tamil screenwriters
Tamil film producers
20th-century Indian dramatists and playwrights
21st-century Indian dramatists and playwrights
Best Original Screenplay National Film Award winners
1952 births
Tamil television directors